Megradina festiva is a grasshopper species in the monotypic genus Megradina, found in Vietnam. It is in the family Pyrgomorphidae, subfamily Orthacridinae, and tribe Nereniini. It is closely related to the New Guinea grasshopper genus Megra.

Megradina festiva is a medium-sized grasshopper with a large, finely punctate head and a slender, elongated body. The holotype is a male collected in the Central Highlands of Vietnam in 1995 by Andrey Vasil'evich Gorochov.

References

Pyrgomorphidae
Caelifera genera
Orthoptera of Vietnam
Monotypic Orthoptera genera